Angela Derochie (born November 4, 1973) is a Canadian former competitive figure skater. She is the 1992 Nebelhorn Trophy bronze medalist and 1998 Canadian national champion in ladies' singles.

Personal life 
Derochie was born on November 4, 1973, in Trenton, Ontario.

Career 
Derochie represented the Gloucester Skating Club in Ottawa, Ontario, and trained at the Canadian Academy of Skating Arts, coached by Peter Dunfield.

In the 1996–97 season, Derochie reached her first senior national podium, winning the silver medal behind Susan Humphreys at the 1997 Canadian Championships. The following season, she debuted on the Champions Series (Grand Prix), placing 9th at the 1997 Skate America and 12th at the 1997 NHK Trophy. She won the gold medal ahead of Keyla Ohs and Jennifer Robinson at the 1998 Canadian Championships in Hamilton, Ontario. She was selected to compete at the 1998 World Championships in Minneapolis and reached the final segment; she ranked 11th in her qualifying group, 19th in the short program, 20th in the free skate and 20th overall.

In the 1998–99 season, Derochie was coached by Marina Zoueva and Eric Loucks at the Minto Skating Club. She was awarded the bronze medal at the 1999 Canadian Championships, behind Robinson and Annie Bellemare, and assigned to the 1999 Four Continents, where she placed tenth.

In September 2006, Derochie joined the coaching staff of Dartmouth Skating Club. She is now the director of the North York Skating Academy in Toronto Ontario.

Programs

Results
GP: Champions Series / Grand Prix

References

Navigation

1973 births
Canadian female single skaters
Living people
People from Quinte West
Sportspeople from Ontario